is a large thermal power station operated by JERA in the city of Hekinan, Aichi, Japan. The facility is located the head of the Chita Peninsula and is the largest coal-fired power station in Japan. The plant is estimated to have been one of the ten most carbon polluting coal-fired power plants in the world in 2018, at 26.64 million tons of carbon dioxide, and relative emissions are estimated at 1.394 kg per kWh.

General information
The power plant was built by Chubu Electric to meet base load demand on reclaimed land on the west coast of Kinuura Bay approximately 40 kilometers south of the city of Nagoya. Its grounds cover 1.6 million square meters. The total generating capacity is 4100 MW. The first unit went online in October 1991. 

In April 2019, all thermal power plant operations of Chubu Electric Power were transferred to JERA, a joint venture between Chubu Electric and TEPCO Fuel & Power, Inc, a subsidiary of Tokyo Electric Power Company. JERA plans to co-fire the burners with 20% ammonia from 2021 to 2025.

Plant details

See also 

 Energy in Japan
 List of power stations in Japan

References

External links

official home page 

1991 establishments in Japan
Energy infrastructure completed in 1991
Coal-fired power stations in Japan
Hekinan, Aichi
Chubu Electric Power
Buildings and structures in Aichi Prefecture